United Nations Security Council resolution 479, adopted unanimously on 28 September 1980, after reminding Member States against the use of threats and force in their international relations, the Council called upon Iran and Iraq to immediately cease any further uses of force and instead settle their dispute through negotiations.

The resolution went on to urge both countries to accept any appropriate offer of mediation, while calling on other Member States to refrain from causing acts that may lead to a further escalation of tensions in the region.

The Council praised the work of the Secretary-General on the matter and requested him to report back to the Security Council within 48 hours.

See also
 Iran–Iraq relations
 Iran–Iraq War
 List of United Nations Security Council Resolutions 401 to 500 (1976–1982)
 Resolutions 514, 522, 540, 552, 582, 588, 598, 612, 616, 619 and 620

References
Text of the Resolution at undocs.org

External links
 

 0479
 0479
1980 in Iran
1980 in Iraq
September 1980 events